James Baylis Allen (1803–1876) was a British engraver. Allen, together with Edward and William Radclyffe and the Willmores, belonged to a school of landscape-engravers which arose in Birmingham, where there were numerous engravers working on iron and steel manufactures.

Biography

Allen was born in Birmingham, 18 April 1803, the son of a button-manufacturer. As a boy he followed his father's business; then about age 15 he was articled to Josiah Allen, an elder brother and general engraver in Birmingham. Three years later he began his artistic training by attending the drawing classes of John Vincent Barber and Samuel Lines.

In 1824 Allen went to London, and found employment in the studio of the Findens, for whose Royal Gallery of British Art he engraved at a later period "Trent in the Tyrol", after Augustus Wall Callcott.

Allen died after a long illness at Camden Town on the 10th January 1876 and was buried on the western side of Highgate Cemetery. The grave (no.144) no longer has a marker but the remains of the plinth are still visible.

Works

Allen's best known plates are those after J. M. W. Turner's drawings for the ‘Rivers of France,’ 1833–5, consisting of views of Amboise, Caudebec-en-Caux, Havre, and St. Germain; and for the ‘England and Wales,’ 1827–32, for which he engraved the plates of Stonyhurst, Upnor Castle, Orfordness, Harborough Sands, and Lowestoft Lighthouse. Other works were ‘The Falls of the Rhine,’ after Turner, for the Keepsake of 1833; some plates after Clarkson Stanfield and Thomas Allom for Charles Heath's Picturesque Annual, and others after Samuel Prout, Roberts, Holland, and James Duffield Harding, for Robert Jennings's Landscape Annual; and ‘The Grand Bal Masqué at the Opera, Paris,’ after Eugène Lami for Allom's France Illustrated.

His larger works were executed chiefly for The Art Journal: 
 The Columns of St. Mark, Venice after Bonington
 Battle of Borodino, Lady Godiva, and The Fiery Furnace after George Jones
 Westminster Bridge, 1745 and London Bridge, 1745 after Samuel Scott, for the Vernon Gallery
 Death of Nelson, Phryne going to the Bath as Venus, Decline of Carthage, Ehrenbreitstein, St. Mawes, Cornwall, and Upnor Castle after Turner for the Turner Gallery
 The Battle of Meeanee after Edward Armitage
 Greenwich Hospital after Chambers
 Hyde Park in 1851 after J. D. Harding
 Venice: the Bucentaur and The Dogana, Venice after Canaletto, and The Herdsman after Berchem, for the Royal Gallery
 The Nelson Column after G. Hawkins
 Smyrna after Allom
 The Temple of Jupiter Panhellenius after Turner

He engraved also a set of five views on the coasts of Suffolk and Kent, and plates for William Henry Bartlett's ‘Ireland,’ 1835, Bartlett's ‘Switzerland,’ 1839, Bartlett's ‘Canadian Scenery,’ 1840, Beattie's ‘Scotland,’ 1836, Finden's ‘Views of the Ports and Harbours of Great Britain,’ 1839, and George Newenham Wright's ‘Rhine, Italy, and Greece,’ 1843.

References

Notes

External links
Illustrated Picture Books
Attribution

Links
 An engraving of J Hartley's  for Fisher's Drawing Room Scrap Book, 1837 with a poetical illustration by Letitia Elizabeth Landon.
 An engraving of William Henry Bartlett's  for Fisher's Drawing Room Scrap Book, 1838 with the poetical illustration The Cedars of Lebanon by Letitia Elizabeth Landon.
 An engraving of Samuel Prout's  for Fisher's Drawing Room Scrap Book, 1838 with a poetical illustration by Letitia Elizabeth Landon.

1803 births
1876 deaths
Burials at Highgate Cemetery
British engravers
Artists from Birmingham, West Midlands